The Phantom of the Opera is a 1990 American two-part television miniseries directed by Tony Richardson and starring Charles Dance in the title role. It is adapted from Arthur Kopit's book from his  stage musical Phantom, which is based loosely on Gaston Leroux's 1910 novel.

Plot
The Phantom of the Opera is a disfigured musician named Erik who lives below the Opéra Garnier in Paris. He has a large part in managing each performance until his friend Gerard Carriere is dismissed. The new manager Choleti refuses to listen to warnings about the "ghost" who haunts the opera house, even when the wardrobe man goes into the depths of the opera house and is killed.

Christine Daaé comes to the Paris Opera House to receive voice lessons; however she is dismissed by Choleti's wife, Carlotta, to working in the costume department. The doorman lets Christine stay in a storage room in the Opera House. Upon hearing her sing, the Phantom is entranced by her voice. He offers to be her teacher, but must remain anonymous; that is why he wears a mask. They begin lessons, and the Phantom falls deeper in love with her.

Erik begins a campaign of humiliation against Carlotta, sabotaging her performances. With Erik's encouragement, Christine earns a singing contract. The Comte de Chagny realizes Christine was his childhood sweetheart. Erik witnesses them together and stays up all night in the rehearsal room.

Finding out Christine has been living in the Opera, Carlotta blackmails Christine into telling her about her vocal coach. When Carlotta informs her husband that Christine's teacher is the Phantom, Choleti gives Christine the female lead of the opera Faust; he is working with the police to capture the Phantom. Carlotta gives Christine a drink that weakens her voice during the performance. The audience boos and Erik is enraged. He cuts through the ropes holding the chandelier and drops it on the audience, then abducts Christine to his underground lair.

The Phantom discovers Carlotta was behind Christine's voice problems and dumps rats on her, driving her insane. Carriere pleads with him to let Christine go, but Erik refuses. He insists that the world above is not fit for her and believes that in time she will love him. Carriere goes to Christine and urges her to get out. He tells her the story of Erik's past and of Erik's mother, a great singer named Belladova to whom she bears a resemblance. Belladova gave birth to him below the opera house, and Erik has lived there his entire life. Christine refuses to leave without talking to Erik.

She asks Erik to show her his face promising him that she would be able to look at him with love and acceptance, as his mother once did. When he does unmask, she faints. In the midst of an anguished breakdown, Erik locks her in one of his chambers. Christine escapes, and Carriere and the Count take her from the Opera House. Christine is stricken with guilt and begs Phillipe to take her back. The Comte agrees and he and Christine approach Choleti about singing that night. Choleti secretly arranges to have police planted throughout the opera house.

Carriere tells Erik that Christine did not mean to hurt him. The older man reveals that he has seen Erik's face, because he is his father. Erik says he knew, as they have the same eyes (the only thing of his face he can bear to look at). Christine sings at that night's performance of Faust. Erik hears her and forces himself up to Box Five. He begins singing with her. Christine and the Phantom sing to each other with such passion that the audience is awed and gives them a standing ovation.

The police shoot at Erik and he grabs ahold of Christine, carrying her off to the roof. The Comte pursues them, but in the ensuing struggle is knocked off the roof, dangling above the street. At Christine's pleading, Erik pulls him to safety. Erik is cornered by police determined to take him alive. Carriere has retrieved a gun and upholding a promise, Carriere shoots him. Erik falls from the roof and Christine runs to him. While cradled in his father's lap, Christine removes Erik's mask, looks him straight in the face and smiles. Erik dies with his father and Christine at his side. Christine replaces Erik's mask and is led away by the Comte.

Cast 
 Charles Dance as Erik/The Phantom of The Opera
 Teri Polo as Christine Daaé/Belladova
 Adam Storke as Comte Philippe de Chagny
 Burt Lancaster as Gerard Carriere
 Ian Richardson as Choleti
 Andréa Ferréol as Carlotta
 Jean-Pierre Cassel as Inspector Ledoux
 Jean Rougerie as Jean Claude
 André Chaumeau as Joseph Buquet

Production 

Arthur Kopit had long been an admirer of Gaston Leroux's story, but felt that the horror premise had left out the possibility of a more compelling relationship between the two main characters. So he came up with a script in which the Phantom is a romantic hero, frightening only to those who would misuse the opera house wherein he dwells – and to those who would stand in the way of Christine's eventual rise to stardom. And he decided to use plenty of music in his storytelling – not original music, but classical opera arias that would imbue his production with a sense of the Phantom's heart, soul and passion. Then Andrew Lloyd Webber came along, and Kopit was devastated: "Here was work that I deeply loved, and it looked for all that world like it would never be seen."

He later heard that the network was in the market for a miniseries, so he sent them a copy of his script. "I had to convince them that I wasn't following on the heels of Lloyd Webber's success," he said. "But once I was able to do that, it wasn't difficult to help them see the potential of this interesting, unusual love story."

Reception 
The miniseries won two Emmy Awards out of five nominations in 1990 for Outstanding Art Direction and Outstanding Achievement in Hairstyling for a Miniseries or a Special. It was also nominated for two Golden Globe Awards in 1991 for Best Mini-Series or Motion Picture Made for Television and Best Performance by an Actor in a Mini-Series or Motion Picture Made for Television (Burt Lancaster).

Entertainment Weekly critic Ken Tucker gave the film a score of A- and said Kopit and director Tony Richardson "make the romance between the Phantom and Christine both touching and frightening, and the casting of Burt Lancaster as Carriere, the manager of the opera company, gives the story weight and great charm...The Phantom of the Opera has a few old-fashioned but genuinely scary moments...It's as if Richardson went back to look at old horror movies by such filmmakers as Val Lewton and James Whale to figure out how they got their spooky but never gruesome effects". Although he found Adam Storke's Count de Chagny bland, he declared that: "...all in all, The Phantom of the Opera is a real achievement: It's rare enough for a costume drama to show up on TV these days; the fact that this is a good one is amazing."

People critic David Hiltbrand gave the film a score of B+ and said "Director Tony Richardson has mounted a sumptuous, stately version of this oft-told epic melodrama, far surpassing the previous TV version with Maximilian Schell and Jane Seymour in 1983. But Lon Chaney must be spinning in his grave, seeing what a rakish romantic his ghoulish Phantom has become over the years." Hiltbrand praised that Burt Lancaster "lends his usual air of refined dignity, and Charles Dance makes an elegant Phantom. But the real zest is provided by Ian Richardson and Andrea Ferreol, who bring great comic verve to the roles of the pompous popinjay of an opera director and his deluded diva of a wife."

The Deseret News critic Joseph Walker said, "Kopit's script maintains his vision throughout, expertly mixing moods ranging from the ridiculous ('I'm not used to killing people,' says the Phantom after a rare violent episode. 'It throws me off.') to the sublime. And the production values throughout are first rate..." Walker also added that Charles Dance is a "superb Phantom – brooding and mysterious, and yet somehow approachable. Polo makes the most of her big TV break, creating a flesh and blood heroine who is utterly believable...The rest of the cast is similarly effective, especially Ferreol who practically steals the show with her broad comic Carlotta."TV Guide gave the film four out of five stars and said Charles Dance is an "excellent Phantom" and "excellent support from Richardson and Lancaster."

The New York Times critic John J. O'Connor was puzzled how the recluse Phantom became "cultivated and talented" and criticized Adam Storke's performance and the "international menu of accents." However, he stated "the physical production is gloriously lavish...And the director Tony Richardson deftly captures the fairy-tale aspects of the story," describing the film as a "variation on Beauty and the Beast, with echoes of Cinderella and enchanted forests." He also stated that "most of the performances transcend the accent difficulties. Mr. Dance is elegant, Mr. Lancaster dignified and Miss Polo, not yet 20 years old, strikingly beautiful. The show is just about stolen, however, by Ian Richardson and Andrea Ferreol...," and concluded "Phantom adds up to an odd but fascinating prime-time diversion."

See also 
 Phantom (musical)

References

External links 

1990 television films
1990 films
Films based on The Phantom of the Opera
Films directed by Tony Richardson
Films scored by John Addison
Saban Entertainment films